Eric Ross Weinstein  (born October 26, 1965) is an American mathematician and podcast host. He was the joint managing director for Thiel Capital from 2013 until 2022. He has a PhD in mathematical physics from Harvard.

Education 
Weinstein received his PhD in mathematical physics from Harvard University in 1992  under the guidance of Isadore Singer. According to Weinstein, Bott was not his PhD advisor in the traditional sense. In his dissertation, Extension of Self-Dual Yang-Mills Equations Across the Eighth Dimension, Weinstein showed that the self-dual Yang–Mills equations were not peculiar to dimension four and admitted generalizations to higher dimensions.

Career

Physics 
Weinstein left academia after stints at the Massachusetts Institute of Technology and the Hebrew University of Jerusalem.   Weinstein was invited to a colloquium by mathematician Marcus du Sautoy at Oxford University's Clarendon Laboratory in May 2013.  There he presented his ideas on a theory of everything called Geometric Unity. Physicists expressed skepticism about the theory.  Joseph Conlon of Oxford stated that some of the predicted particles would already have been detected in existing accelerators such as the Large Hadron Collider. Science writer Jennifer Ouellette criticized the colloquium in a blog for Scientific American, arguing that experts could not properly evaluate Weinstein's ideas because there was no published paper.

On April 1, 2021, Weinstein released a draft paper on Geometric Unity in a guest appearance on the podcast The Joe Rogan Experience. Weinstein qualified in his paper that he "is not a physicist," but an "entertainer" and podcast host. It received strong criticism from some in the scientific community. Timothy Nguyen, whose PhD thesis intersects with Weinstein's work said what Weinstein has presented so far has had "no visible impact" and "gaps, both mathematical and physical in origin" that "jeopardize Geometric Unity as a well-defined theory, much less one that is a candidate for a theory of everything."

Intellectual dark web 
Weinstein  coined the term "intellectual dark web" and named himself and his brother as members after his brother Bret Weinstein resigned from  Evergreen State College, in response to a 2017 campus controversy. The term is used to describe a number of academics and podcast hosts.

References

Notes

External links 
 https://ericweinstein.org/

1965 births
Living people
20th-century American mathematicians
20th-century American Jews
American podcasters
American venture capitalists
Harvard Graduate School of Arts and Sciences alumni
University of Pennsylvania alumni
21st-century American Jews